Patriarch Ignatius may refer to:

 Ignatius of Antioch, Bishop of Antioch in 68–107
 Ignatios of Constantinople, Patriarch of Constantinople in 847–858 and 867–877
 Ignatius II, Syriac Orthodox Patriarch of Antioch in 878–883
 Ignatius III David, Syriac Orthodox Patriarch of Antioch in 1222–1252
 Ignatius of Bulgaria, Patriarch of Bulgaria c. 1272–1278
 Ignatius of Moscow, Patriarch of Moscow and all Russia in 1605–1606
 Ignatius III Atiyah,  Greek Orthodox Patriarch of Antioch in 1619–1634
 Ignatius IV Sarrouf, Melkite Greek Catholic Patriarch of Antioch in 1812
 Ignatius V Qattan, Melkite Greek Catholic Patriarch of Antioch in 1816–1833
 Ignatius I Daoud, Syriac Catholic Patriarch of Antioch in 1998–2001
 Ignatius IV of Antioch, Greek Orthodox Patriarch of Antioch in 1979–2012
 Ignatius Zakka I Iwas, Syriac Orthodox Patriarch of Antioch in 1980–2014
 "Ignatius" has been the first name of all the Syriac Orthodox Patriarchs of Antioch since the 15th century AD